Celiptera guerreronis is a moth of the family Erebidae. It is found on Mexico (Guerrero).

References

Moths described in 1940
Celiptera